The Chesterfield Marathon was a long-distance running event held in Chesterfield, United Kingdom and established in 2014. It ran twice, in 2014 and 2015, being suspended in 2016 and not yet returning.

Course

The marathon was run over a fairly undulating course with route markers at one mile intervals. See the gradient profile to the right for more detail.

The course began at Queen's Park, and after passing Rose Hill and the Crooked Spire followed the A617 to Temple Normanton, Holmewood and Hasland, followed by the A61 to Lockoford Lane. The route then proceeded to Dunston via Racecourse Road, through Newbold on Keswick Drive and Loundsley Green Road before heading into Holmebrook Park and on Linacre Road towards Brampton. The course took a winding route through Brampton including Ashgate Road, Old Road, Springfield Avenue before heading onto Saltergate into the town centre. The last section of the route passed through Vicar Lane and West Bars to then turn back into Queens Park at the finish line.

References

Marathons in the United Kingdom
Chesterfield, Derbyshire
Sport in Derbyshire